Boonesborough or Boonesboro is an unincorporated community in Madison County, Kentucky, United States. Founded by famed frontiersman Daniel Boone in 1775 as one of the first English-speaking settlements west of the Appalachian Mountains, Boonesborough lies in the central part of the state along the Kentucky River and is the site of Fort Boonesborough State Park, which includes the Kentucky River Museum. The park site has been rebuilt to look like a working fort of the time that Boone resided there.

Boonesborough is part of the Richmond-Berea micropolitan area. It is located at the junction of Kentucky Route 388 and Kentucky Route 627.

History

Boonesborough was founded as Boone's Station by the frontiersman Daniel Boone while working for Richard Henderson and Nathanial Hart of the Transylvania Company. Boone led a group of settlers (which included a number of African Americans) through the mountains from Fort Watauga (present-day Elizabethton in Tennessee), carving the Wilderness Road through the Cumberland Gap, and established Fort Boonesborough. Boone lived there from 1775 to 1779. The region was at that time part of the Commonwealth of Virginia, which officially chartered Boonesborough in October 1779. It was one of the first English-speaking communities west of the Appalachian Mountains. Boone successfully led his fellow settlers during the Siege of Boonesborough in 1778. He then moved to his son Israel's settlement at Boone's New Station near present-day Athens, Kentucky.

Although the town served as a way-station for pioneers venturing further into Kentucky during the 1780s and 1790s, it never attracted a significant long-term population, and thus slowly declined. By 1877, Boonesborough had "almost disappeared as a village".

Further reading
Ranck, George W. Boonesborough: Its Founding, Pioneer Struggles, Indian Experiences, Transylvania Days, and Revolutionary Annals. 1901.

See also
 Boone's New Station, now Boone Station State Historic Site
 Booneville, originally known as Boone's Station
 Squire Boone's Station, established by Daniel's brother

References

External links

Fort Boonesborough State Park official web site.
Fort Boonesborough Foundation

Unincorporated communities in Madison County, Kentucky
Unincorporated communities in Kentucky
Daniel Boone
Richmond–Berea micropolitan area
Colonial settlements in North America